Stir-fried hawthorn is a traditional dish of Beijing cuisine, made from Chinese hawthorn fruits.

Another traditional dish of Beijing cuisine, hawthorn yogurt (hongguolao, 红果酪), utilizes stir-fried Chinese hawthorn fruits as its main ingredient by adding it to Nai Lao.

See also
Tanghulu

References 

Beijing cuisine
Chinese desserts